DAGAMBA is a Latvian band formed in 2011. The group consists of five members: cellist Valters Pūce, cellist Antons Trocjuks, double bass player Alise Broka, pianist Dainis Tenis and drummer Artūrs Jermaks. Throughout DAGAMBA's existence, they have released five albums. The group has performed in Latvia, USA, Ukraine, Lithuania, Poland, Italy, Russia, Australia, Estonia, Turkey and other countries. The most recent album that they have released is called "Dagamba feat Tchaikovsky".

History 
The band was formed in 2011 when two classical cellists Valters Pūce from Latvia and Antons Trocjuks from Ukraine decided to leave the cellist group “Melo-M” and created a new instrumental group called “Dagamba”.  After four years, percussionist Hamidreza Rahbaralam from Iran and pianist Dainis Tenis from Lithuania also joined the group. In 2016, drummer Artūrs Jermaks joined the band. The newest member of the group, double bass player Alise Broka, joined in 2020. According to the band, their music combines different cultures in a way they consider unique. The music of "DAGAMBA" is a mix of rock, pop, world and classical music. On August 24, 2011 DAGAMBA released their first single “Aplis” (“Circle”).

Group members 
Cellist Valters Puce graduated from Emils Darzins Music High School and Jāzeps Vītols Latvian Academy of Music. He has won several international competitions - "Concertino Prague", "Music World 2000 Festival Internazionale Fivizzano", "Terem Crossover Competition". Antons Trocjuks also graduated from Emils Darzins Music High school, then graduated from Nikolay Rimsky - Korsakov Music College in Saint Petersburg. He has won competitions including the "Terem Crossover Competition", Igor Mravinsky's cellist contest in Saint Petersburg, "J. F. Docauer" new cellist contest in Germany, Carl Davidov's cellist contest, International Competition of 21st Century Virtuoso in Moscow, International Music Tournament in Germany, as well as the Competition for Musicians of all Instruments in Italy.

Discography 
During "DAGAMBA's" existence they have released five albums. In 2012 they released an album called “New life”. Their album presentation happened in a restaurant called “Ar mani atkal runā kaijas” (“Gulls talk to me again”). Dagamba's second album “Recycled” (2015) includes compositions from ballet “Romeo and Juliet” and Johann Sebastian Bach, Friedrich Georg Hendel music that are combined with jazz and rock and roll pieces. In 2016 group released an album “Seasons”. Many artists performed at the album release concert - Aminata Savadogo, Ralfs Eilands and “Latvian Voices”. The group's fourth album Ludwig van Rammstein (2017) was mostly made by combining classical musician Ludwig van Beethoven music with the metal group Rammstein's music. Their latest album Dagamba feat Tchaikovsky which includes Pytor Ilyich Tchaikovsky's compositions in a new sound and the group's newest music was released in 2019.

Concerts 
In 2017 they had concerts in several cities in Latvia (Riga, Jelgava, Rezenke, Venspils, Liepaja, Cesis) to promote their album “Ludwig van Rammstein”.

The group's biggest concert was on April 12, 2019. It was their first concert in “Arena Riga” with approximately 7000 attendees. At the concert, they played their newest album Dagamba feat Tchaikovsky  and the most popular compositions from previous albums. The opening band for concert was string quartet “Sotto Voce” that played original Tchaikovsky music. In the concert many artists joined "Dagamba" – ethnic music group “Tautumeitas”, violinist Daniils Bulajevs, double bass player Alise Broka, Riga Dome Boys Choir, rapper Mesa and choreographer Liene Grava dancers.

The group has also performed several times in Russia to promote their album Seasons, Ludwig van Rammstein and Dagamba feat Tchaikovsky. They have also had concerts in Estonia, Turkey and Australia.

References 

2011 establishments in Latvia
Latvian rock music groups
Latvian world music groups
Musical groups established in 2011
Crossover (music)